Chan Cham Hei (born 17 June 1991 in Hong Kong) is a former Hong Kong professional football player who plays as a left-back and is currently a free agent.

Career statistics
As of 15 December 2012

Honours
Eastern
 Hong Kong First Division: 2014–15
 Hong Kong FA Cup: 2014-15
 Hong Kong League Cup: 2014-15
Kitchee
 Hong Kong First Division: 2013-14
South China
 Hong Kong First Division: 2012-13

External links
 

Hong Kong footballers
1991 births
Living people
Fourway Athletics players
Hong Kong Premier League players
Hong Kong First Division League players
South China AA players
Kitchee SC players
Happy Valley AA players
Southern District FC players
Dreams Sports Club players
Hong Kong Rangers FC players

Association football fullbacks